Hagee is a surname. Notable people with the surname include:  

 Michael Hagee (born 1944), 33rd Commandant of the United States Marine Corps
 John Hagee (born 1940), American pastor and televangelist

See also
 Hagen (surname)
 Hager
 Magee (surname)